VH1 debuted the first annual VH1 Divas concert in 1998. VH1 Divas Live was created to support the channel's Save The Music Foundation and subsequent concerts in the series have also benefited that foundation. The VH1 Divas concerts aired annually from 1998 to 2004. After a five-year hiatus, the series returned in 2009 with a younger-skewed revamp. In 2010 the concert saluted the troops and in 2011 it celebrated soul music, doubling the previous year's ratings. After a dance music-focused 2012 edition aired live from the Shrine Auditorium in Los Angeles on December 16, 2012, the show took another hiatus before being revived on December 5, 2016, at the Kings Theatre in Brooklyn, New York with a holiday theme and achieved its highest ratings in over a decade.

VH1 Divas Live

VH1 Divas Live: An Honors Concert For The VH1 Save The Music Foundation aired live on April 14, 1998.

Summary
The first "VH1 Divas" show, at New York City's Beacon Theatre, featured international music stars Aretha Franklin, Celine Dion, Gloria Estefan, Mariah Carey and Shania Twain. In a guest appearance, singer-songwriter Carole King led the performers through versions of her songs "You've Got a Friend" and "(You Make Me Feel Like) A Natural Woman".

Headliners
Aretha Franklin
Celine Dion
Gloria Estefan
Mariah Carey
Shania Twain

Guest performer
Carole King

Presenters
Jennifer Aniston
Joan Osborne
Patricia Arquette
Teri Hatcher
Sarah McLachlan
Sarah Jessica Parker
Susan Sarandon

The show was produced by Grammys producer Ken Ehrlich, directed by Michael Simon and written by producer/writer Martin Lewis.

Show sequence
Mariah Carey – "My All"
Mariah Carey – "Make It Happen"
Gloria Estefan – "Turn The Beat Around"
Gloria Estefan – "Heaven's What I Feel"
Gloria Estefan – Megamix:
"Dr. Beat"
"Conga"
"Rhythm Is Gonna Get You"
"1-2-3"
"Get On Your Feet"
Shania Twain – "Man! I Feel Like a Woman!"
Shania Twain – "You're Still the One"
Aretha Franklin – "A Rose Is Still a Rose" – Not released on the live album or home video
Aretha Franklin and Mariah Carey – "Chain of Fools"
Aretha Franklin – "Here We Go Again" – Not released on the live album or home video
Celine Dion – "River Deep, Mountain High"
Celine Dion and Carole King – "The Reason"
Celine Dion – "My Heart Will Go On"
Carole King – "It's Too Late" – Not aired in television broadcast, nor released on the live album or home video
Carole King, Celine Dion, Gloria Estefan and Shania Twain – "You've Got a Friend"
The Divas – "(You Make Me Feel Like) A Natural Woman"
The Divas – "Testimony" – Shortened in the home video release

Performances on the album and home video release
"My All" – 05:45
"Make It Happen" – 05:29
"Turn The Beat Around" – 05:07
"Heaven's What I Feel" – 04:54
"Dr. Beat"/"Conga"/"Rhythm Is Gonna Get You"/"1-2-3"/"Get on Your Feet" – 03:32
"Man! I Feel Like a Woman" – 03:55
"You're Still the One" – 03:33
"Chain of Fools" – 04:24
"River Deep, Mountain High" – 05:12
"The Reason" – 05:59
"My Heart Will Go On" – 04:41
"You've Got a Friend" – 05:29
"(You Make Me Feel Like) A Natural Woman" – 05:15
"Testimony" – 09:47

Charts

Certifications

Reviews
 New York Times Pop Review
 All Music review

Musician credits
(in order of appearance)

Mariah Carey's band: Randy Jackson – Bass; Gigi Gonaway – Drums; Vernon Black – Guitar; Andrew Sherman – Keyboards; Michael Mcknight – Programmer; Juliet Haffner – Viola; Laura Seaton, Andre E. Stien, Peter M. Weimar – Violins; Marquino Brazil – Percussion; Melonie Daniels, Nicki Richards, Sherry Mcghee, Mary Ann Tatum – Background Vocals
Gloria Estefan's band: Jorge Casa – Bass; Clay Ostwald – Keyboards; Tim Mitchell, Rene Toledo – Guitars; Olin Burgos – Drums; Randy Barlow – Trombone & Trumpet; Teddy Mulet, Douglas Michaels – Trumpet; Kenny Andersom, Tom Timko – Saxes/Reeds; Rita Quintero, Juan "Chieto" Quinonez, George Noriega, Donna Allen – Vocals
Shania Twain's band: Brent Barcus – Guitar; Andrew Cichon – Bass; James Blair – Drums; Cory Churko, Allison Cornell – Mandolin/Fiddle; Marc D. Muller – Pedal Steel; Hardy Hempill – Keyboards
Aretha Franklin's band: H.B. Barnum – Conductor; David Rokeach – Drums; Francisco Centeno – Bass; Teddy Richards – Guitar; Richard Gibbs – Piano; Darryll Houston – Organ; Byron Strippling, Glenn Drews, Jorge Arciniega – Trumpet; Robert Trowers, Larry Farrell, Keith O'Quinn – Trombone; Lawrence Feldman, Dave Tofani, Ernie Fields Jr. Roger Rosenberg – Sax; Mae Kohn, Diana Madison, William Moore – Background vocals; Jaqui Whitman – Tambourine; Michael Beardon – Keyboards; Joe Passaro – Percussion
Céline Dion's band: Claude "Mégo" Lemay – Keyboards; Dominique Messier – Drums; Ives "Ivo" Frulla – Keyboards; André Coutu – Guitars; Paul Picard – Percussion; Élise Dugay- Background vocals & Tin Whistle; Terry Bradford, Julie LeBlanc – Background vocals

Aretha's band was used for her duet with Mariah Carey (Chain of Fools) and the finale (Natural Woman, and Testimony).

VH1 Divas Live/99

VH1 Divas Live/99: An Honors Concert For The VH1 Save The Music Foundation aired live on April 13, 1999.

Headliners
Whitney Houston
Tina Turner
Cher
Brandy

Special guest performer
Elton John

Guest performers
Mary J. Blige
Chaka Khan
Faith Hill
Treach
LeAnn Rimes

Presenters
Ana Gasteyer
Sarah Michelle Gellar
Elizabeth Hurley
Ashley Judd
Cheri Oteri
Gloria Reuben
Molly Shannon
Claudia Schiffer
Celebrities shown in the audience included Hugh Grant, Donald Trump, Susan Lucci, Star Jones, Martha Stewart and Paul Shaffer. Paul Gorman was also present.

Show sequence
Tina Turner – "The Best"
Tina Turner – "Let's Stay Together" – Not released on CD or DVD
Tina Turner and Elton John – "The Bitch Is Back"
Tina Turner, Elton John, and Cher – "Proud Mary"
Elton John – "I'm Still Standing"
Elton John and LeAnn Rimes – "Written in the Stars" – Not released on CD or DVD
LeAnn Rimes – "How Do I Live"
Elton John – "Like Father Like Son" – Not released on CD or DVD
Cher – "If I Could Turn Back Time"
Cher – "Believe" – Not released on CD or DVD
Brandy – "Have You Ever?"/ Almost Doesn't Count
Brandy and Faith Hill – "(Everything I Do) I Do It for You"
Faith Hill – "This Kiss"
Whitney Houston – "It's Not Right, But It's Okay" – Not released on CD or DVD; audio version now available for download on iTunes
Whitney Houston and Mary J. Blige – "Ain't No Way"
Whitney Houston and Treach – "My Love Is Your Love" – Not released on CD or DVD; audio version now available for download on iTunes
Whitney Houston – "I Will Always Love You"
Whitney Houston and Chaka Khan – "I'm Every Woman"
Whitney Houston, Chaka Khan, Faith Hill, Brandy, LeAnn Rimes, and Mary J. Blige – "I'm Every Woman (reprise)"

Performances on the CD, VHS, and DVD release
Tina Turner – "The Best"
Tina Turner and Elton John – "The Bitch Is Back"
Tina Turner, Elton John, and Cher – "Proud Mary"
Cher – "If I Could Turn Back Time"
LeAnn Rimes – "How Do I Live"
Elton John – "I'm Still Standing"
Brandy – "Have You Ever?"/"Almost Doesn't Count"
Brandy and Faith Hill – "(Everything I Do) I Do It for You"
Faith Hill – "This Kiss"
Whitney Houston and Mary J. Blige – "Ain't No Way"
Whitney Houston – "I Will Always Love You"
Whitney Houston and Chaka Khan – "I'm Every Woman"
Whitney Houston, Chaka Khan, Faith Hill, Brandy, Mary J. Blige, and LeAnn Rimes – "I'm Every Woman (reprise)"

Charts and certification

VH1 Divas 2000: A Tribute to Diana Ross
VH1 Divas 2000: A Tribute to Diana Ross – An Honors Concert for the VH1 Save the Music Foundation was the first of three concerts in the series not aired live. It was recorded on April 9, 2000 at New York's Madison Square Garden and first aired on April 11, 2000.  Diana Ross requested the concert be recorded as time constraints for the airing of commercials would not allow enough time for her to change costumes. The well-received show took a mammoth 6 hours to record.  This special also marked the re-introduction of Lynda Laurence and Scherrie Payne as Supremes, who were touring with Diana Ross. Laurence and Payne were Supremes during the 1970s.

The concert was never released on CD or DVD. Two of the songs were released as b-sides of singles from Mariah Carey and Destiny's Child.

Summary
Diana Ross knows how to feel the love in the room, which may explain why she frequently abandoned the stage to wander among the audience in the midst of her own tribute at Madison Square Garden. Ross still commanded plenty of star wattage. In their own singular ways, Mariah Carey, Donna Summer, Destiny's Child, Faith Hill and even RuPaul all hailed the Supremest Supreme. Ross sported a spangled outfit that matched Mariah Carey's own during their performance of "Baby Love." Donna Summer covered "Reflections" and Faith Hill bounced through "Love Child". Destiny's Child took on "Upside Down," accompanied by composer Nile Rodgers on guitar. But it was up to Ross to provide the biggest shock of all – a wild reunion with latter-day Supremes Linda Laurence and Scherrie Payne to perform "You Keep Me Hanging On" and "Love Is Like An Itching In My Heart."

Headliners
Diana Ross
Mariah Carey
Donna Summer
Faith Hill

Guest performers
Scherrie Payne
Lynda Laurence
Destiny's Child
RuPaul

Presenters
Angela Bassett
Ana Gasteyer
Cheri Oteri
Molly Shannon
Hilary Swank

Show sequence
Mariah Carey – "Love Hangover/Heartbreaker (Remix)" – Audio version included in Mariah's single "Can't Take That Away"
Donna Summer – "Reflections"
Faith Hill – "Breathe"
Faith Hill – "Love Child"
Donna Summer – "Bad Girls"
Donna Summer – "Love Is The Healer"
Mariah Carey – "Can't Take That Away (Mariah's Theme)"
Faith Hill – "What's In It For Me"
RuPaul – "I'm Coming Out"
Destiny's Child – "Say My Name"
Destiny's Child – "Upside Down" – Audio version included in Destiny's Child single "Jumpin' , Jumpin'"
Diana Ross – "Touch Me In The Morning"
Diana Ross – "Endless Love"
Diana Ross – "The Best Years Of My Life"
Diana Ross & The Supremes – "You Keep Me Hangin' On"
Diana Ross & The Supremes – "Love Is Like An Itching In My Heart"
Diana Ross and Mariah Carey – Medley: "Baby Love" and "Stop! In The Name Of Love"
The Divas – "Ain't No Mountain High Enough"
Diana Ross – "I Will Survive"

VH1 Divas Live: The One And Only Aretha Franklin

Summary
This all-star tribute to Aretha Franklin at New York's Radio City Music Hall gave props to a woman who has been at the center of American music since arriving on the scene in the mid '60s. Franklin easily adapted herself to a variety of guests, crooning with the Backstreet Boys on "Chain of Fools," matching wails with Mary J. Blige on "Do Right Woman, Do Right Man," and letting Kid Rock storm her barn on "Rock Steady." She even joined a jazz ensemble led by Herbie Hancock for a little scat. Marc Anthony and Celia Cruz saluted the First Lady of Soul with salsa. Neo-soul up-and-comer Jill Scott made "A Natural Woman" feel like the real thing, and the New Jersey Mass Choir accompanied Franklin's assault on the hymn "Precious Memories." Janet Jackson, Sigourney Weaver, Renée Zellweger, Stevie Wonder and the Sopranos cast were among those looking on in awe.

The event occurred on April 10, 2001, and was released on CD/DVD in 2017 by MVD Visual.

Headliners
Aretha Franklin
Marc Anthony
Mary J. Blige
Backstreet Boys
Celia Cruz
Nelly Furtado
Jill Scott
Kid Rock

Guest performers
Bishop Paul Morton & Choir
James Carter
Ron Carter
Herbie Hancock
Roy Haynes
Russell Malone
Clark Terry
Stevie Wonder

Presenters
Pamela Anderson
Lorraine Bracco
Drea de Matteo
Edie Falco
Janet Jackson
Aida Turturro
Sigourney Weaver
Renée Zellweger

Show sequence
Aretha Franklin – "I Can't Turn You Loose" 
Aretha Franklin and Backstreet Boys – "Chain Of Fools" 
Aretha Franklin – "Ain't No Way" 
Marc Anthony and Celia Cruz – "Quimbara" – Not released on CD or DVD
Jill Scott – "(You Make Me Feel Like A) Natural Woman"
Jill Scott – "A Long Walk"
Aretha Franklin – "Think"
Nelly Furtado – "I'm Like a Bird" – Not released on CD or DVD
Mary J. Blige – "Day Dreaming"
Mary J. Blige and Aretha Franklin – "Do Right Woman, Do Right Man"
Aretha Franklin – "Nessun Dorma" 
 Aretha Franklin with Herbie Hancock, Clark Terry, Ron Carter, Roy Haynes, James Carter, and Russell Malone – Mumbles – Not released on CD or DVD
Aretha Franklin and Kid Rock – "Rock Steady"
Aretha Franklin with Bishop Paul Morton & Choir – "Precious Memories" 
Aretha Franklin – "Respect" 
Aretha Franklin, Mary J. Blige, Jill Scott, Celia Cruz, Nelly Furtado, Backstreet Boys, Stevie Wonder, Marc Anthony, Herbie Hancock, Clark Terry, Ron Carter, Roy Haynes, James Carter, Russell Malone, and Aretha Franklin's Band – "Freeway Of Love" – Only released on DVD
 Aretha Franklin and Willa Ward – "Weeping May Endure For A Night"/"Surely God Is Able" – Not broadcast or released

VH1 Divas Las Vegas

VH1 Divas Las Vegas: An Honors Concert For The VH1 Save The Music Foundation aired live from the MGM Grand Las Vegas on May 23, 2002. For the first time, Divas Live broadcast from a city other than New York. This time around, Las Vegas played host city to the fifth Divas concert.

After being invited by Whitney Houston in 1999, an appearance that gave her big publicity worldwide, Mary J. Blige asked her friend to join her on Divas three years later to perform together her song "Rainy Dayz".

A CD/DVD of the concert was released later that year, but not all the performances or performers (most notably those of co-headliner Mary J. Blige) were included, due to various record label issues.

Host
Ellen DeGeneres

Announcer
Wayne Newton

Headliners
Cher
Céline Dion
Dixie Chicks
Mary J Blige
Shakira

Guest performers
Anastacia
Whitney Houston
Cyndi Lauper
Stevie Nicks
Special diva guitarist Meredith Brooks

Show sequence
Ellen DeGeneres – "Shoop" – Not released on CD or DVD
Céline Dion and Anastacia – "You Shook Me All Night Long"
Cher – "Believe"
Cher – "Song for the Lonely"
Cher and Cyndi Lauper – "If I Could Turn Back Time" – Not released on CD or DVD
Dixie Chicks – "Long Time Gone" – Not released on CD or DVD
Shakira – "Underneath Your Clothes"
Mary J. Blige and Whitney Houston – "Rainy Dayz" – Not released on CD or DVD
Mary J. Blige – "No More Drama" – Not released on CD or DVD
Dixie Chicks – "Wide Open Spaces" – Not released on CD or DVD
Dixie Chicks and Stevie Nicks – "Landslide"
Anastacia – "One Day in Your Life"
Mary J. Blige and Shakira – "Love Is A Battlefield" – Not released on CD or DVD
Céline Dion – "I'm Alive"
Céline Dion – "A New Day Has Come"
Elvis Tribute Finale Medley:
Anastacia – "Jailhouse Rock"
Dixie Chicks – "That's All Right (Mama)" – Not released on CD or DVD
Shakira – "Always on My Mind"
Mary J. Blige – "Blue Suede Shoes" – Not released on CD or DVD
Stevie Nicks – "Wear My Ring Around Your Neck" – Not released on CD or DVD
Cher – "Heartbreak Hotel"
Céline Dion- "Can't Help Falling in Love"
The Divas – "You Shook Me All Night Long (reprise)" – Not released on CD or DVD

VH1 Divas Duets
VH1 Divas Duets: An Honors Concert For The VH1 Save The Music Foundation aired live from the MGM Grand Las Vegas on May 22, 2003.

Summary
Chaka Khan, Beyoncé, Lisa Marie Presley, Whitney Houston, Celine Dion, Mary J. Blige, Jewel, Ashanti, Sharon Osbourne, Aisha Tyler, Stevie Wonder, Pat Benatar, Shania Twain, Bobby Brown and the Isley Brothers joined host Queen Latifah when "VH1 Divas Duets: A Benefit Concert for the VH1 Save the Music Foundation" aired live from the MGM Grand in Las Vegas on Thursday, May 22 at 9:00pm (ET/PT). Tarralyn Ramsey was the winner of Born to Diva and performed on stage with the Divas!

The concert was never released on CD or DVD.

Host and performer
Queen Latifah

Headliners
Beyoncé
Jewel
Lisa Marie Presley
Chaka Khan
Mary J. Blige
Ashanti
Whitney Houston

Guest performers
Pat Benatar
Céline Dion
Bobby Brown
The Isley Brothers
Shania Twain
Stevie Wonder
'Born To Diva' winner Tarralyn Ramsey

Presenters
Sharon Osbourne
Aisha Tyler

Show sequence
Queen Latifah – "When You're Good To Latifah"
Beyoncé and Jewel – "Proud Mary"
Céline Dion – "Have You Ever Been In Love"
Chaka Khan – Medley: "I Feel For You"/"I'm Every Woman"
Mary J. Blige – Medley: "Real Love"/"Love No Limit"/"Family Affair"
The Isley Brothers and Ashanti – "Who's That Lady?"
Beyoncé – "Dangerously In Love"
Lisa Marie Presley – "Lights Out"
Lisa Marie Presley and Pat Benatar – "Heartbreaker"
Ashanti – "Rock wit U (Awww Baby)"
Whitney Houston and Bobby Brown – Medley: "Something In Common"/"My Love"
Jewel – "Intuition"
Chaka Khan and Mary J. Blige – "Sweet Thing"
Tarralyn Ramsey – "I Wanna Dance With Somebody (Who Loves Me)"
Whitney Houston – "Try It On My Own"
Stevie Wonder tribute medley:
Shania Twain and Stevie Wonder – "Superstition"
Whitney Houston and Stevie Wonder – "I Was Made To Love Her"
Beyoncé and Stevie Wonder  – "Signed, Sealed, Delivered I'm Yours"
Jewel and Stevie Wonder – "You Are The Sunshine Of My Life"
Mary J. Blige and Stevie Wonder – "Superwoman"
Ashanti and Stevie Wonder – "Do I Do"
Chaka Khan and Stevie Wonder – "Tell Me Something Good"
Queen Latifah and Stevie Wonder – "Living For The City"
Stevie Wonder, Whitney Houston, Mary J. Blige, Beyoncé, Chaka Khan, Jewel, Ashanti and Queen Latifah – "Higher Ground"

VH1 Divas 2004
VH1 Divas: An Honors Concert For The VH1 Save The Music Foundation aired live from the MGM Grand Las Vegas on April 18, 2004.

The show marks the first appearance of close friends and R&B and soul legends Patti LaBelle (who was told by producers she would be considered "top dog" ) and Gladys Knight after they had turned down previous offers to appear. Gladys could never stay for the finale due to obligations with her one-woman show at the famed Flamingo Las Vegas. Kylie Minogue was originally confirmed as a headliner for the 1980s themed show, but withdrew shortly after.

Aside from the normal set of presenters, the concert also featured video testimonials from Chaka Khan, Carly Simon, Gloria Estefan, Mary J. Blige, Vanessa Williams, Alicia Keys, Pharrell Williams, Kathy Griffin (in what would prove to be the first of three consecutive appearances), Marg Helgenberger and Usher on the word "diva", their favorite divas, as well as the importance of music education in schools.

The concert was never released on CD or DVD.

Summary
They came. They saw. They sang their hearts out! Divas delivered a night of soulful, sexy and unstoppable performances in the city it defines electrifying entertainment: Las Vegas, Nevada. The seventh annual VH1 "Divas" show was a star-studded benefit concert for the VH1 Save the Music Foundation it featured performances by Patti LaBelle, Gladys Knight, Debbie Harry, Jessica Simpson, Joss Stone, Cyndi Lauper, Ashanti, Blondie, Eve, Sheila E., Tom Jones, and The Pussycat Dolls featuring Carmen Electra.

Headliners
Patti LaBelle
Jessica Simpson
Joss Stone
Cyndi Lauper
Debbie Harry
Gladys Knight
Ashanti
Eve

Guest performers
Blondie
Sheila E.
Tom Jones
The Pussycat Dolls (featuring Carmen Electra)

Presenters
Jessica Alba
Tyra Banks
Rachel Bilson
Daryl Hannah
Jamie-Lynn Discala
Nia Vardalos

Show sequence
Patti LaBelle, Jessica Simpson, and Cyndi Lauper – "Lady Marmalade"
Debbie Harry and Eve – "Rapture"  
Joss Stone – "Fell In Love With A Boy"
Ashanti – "Medley: I'm Coming Out / Mo' Money Mo' Problems"
Patti LaBelle – "New Day"
Cyndi Lauper and Sheila E. – "Stay" 
Cyndi Lauper and Patti LaBelle – "Medley: Time After Time / True Colors"
Jessica Simpson – "Take My Breath Away"
Jessica Simpson – "Angels"
Patti LaBelle – "Love, Need And Want You"
Patti LaBelle – "If Only You Knew"
Patti LaBelle – "You'll Never Walk Alone"
Tom Jones and The Pussycat Dolls – "Medley: Tainted Love / You Can Leave Your Hat On"
Blondie – "Good Boys"
Blondie and Joss Stone – "One Way Or Another"
Gladys Knight – "The Way We Were"
Gladys Knight Medley:
Gladys Knight and Joss Stone – "I Don't Want To Do Wrong"
Gladys Knight and Jessica Simpson – "Midnight Train To Georgia"
Gladys Knight, Jessica Simpson, and Joss Stone – "I've Got To Use My Imagination"
1980s Medley Finale:
Cyndi Lauper – "Girls Just Want To Have Fun"
Sheila E. – "The Glamorous Life"
Blondie – "Call Me"
Ashanti – "Ain't Nobody"
Joss Stone – "(If You Love Someone) Set Them Free"
Jessica Simpson – "Higher Love"
The Pussycat Dolls  – "Girls On Film"
Tom Jones – "Kiss"
Patti LaBelle – "New Attitude"
Patti LaBelle, Cyndi Lauper, Debbie Harry, Joss Stone, Jessica Simpson, Sheila E., Ashanti, and The Pussycat Dolls – "New Attitude (Reprise)"

VH1 Divas 2009

VH1 Divas: An Honors Concert For The VH1 Save The Music Foundation  aired live on September 17, 2009, at the Brooklyn Academy of Music (BAM) Howard Gilman Opera House in Brooklyn, New York. Paula Abdul hosted and performed. This concert was never released on CD or DVD.

Host and performer
Paula Abdul

Headliners
Adele
Kelly Clarkson
Miley Cyrus
Jennifer Hudson
Leona Lewis
Jordin Sparks

Guest performers
India.Arie
Sheryl Crow
Melissa Etheridge
Cyndi Lauper
Martina McBride
Stevie Wonder

Presenters
Toni Braxton
Corbin Bleu
Lauren Conrad
Kathy Lee Gifford
Kathy Griffin
Keri Hilson
Hoda Kotb
Ryan Kwanten
Liza Minnelli
Whitney Port
Sam Trammell
Asher Book, Anna Maria Perez de Tagle, Kherington Payne, Naturi Naughton, and Walter Perez from the cast of Fame.

Show sequence
Paula Abdul – Medley: "Cold Hearted"/"Opposites Attract"/"Straight Up"/"Forever Your Girl"
Jennifer Hudson – "Spotlight"
Kelly Clarkson – "Already Gone"
Jordin Sparks – "S.O.S. (Let the Music Play)"
Adele – "Hometown Glory"
Leona Lewis – "Happy"
Leona Lewis and Cyndi Lauper – "True Colors"
Miley Cyrus – "Party in the U.S.A."
 Adele and India.Arie – "Video"
Jordin Sparks and Martina McBride – "A Broken Wing"
Jennifer Hudson and Stevie Wonder – "All In Love Is Fair"
Miley Cyrus and Sheryl Crow – "If It Makes You Happy"
Kelly Clarkson and Melissa Etheridge – "Bring Me Some Water"

VH1 Divas Salute The Troops

VH1 Divas Salute The Troops  was the second of the three concerts in the series not aired live.  It was recorded on Friday, December 3, 2010, at Marine Corps Air Station Miramar while Paramore was filmed earlier in the week at Army Camp Arifjan in Kuwait. The special first aired on Sunday, December 5, 2010 and broadcast internationally by the Armed Forces Network.

The concert also featured a telecast featuring First Lady Michelle Obama, Taylor Swift, Beyoncé (in her third appearance on the series), Fergie, P!nk, Ke$ha and Carrie Underwood delivering special messages to the troops. Certain select servicemen and women from Miramar, Naval Base Coronado, Camp Pendleton, and Camp Arifjan were also presented in video portraits, documenting their careers and journey in the US military.

This show was never released on CD or DVD.

Host
Kathy Griffin

Headliners
Katy Perry
Sugarland
Grace Potter and the Nocturnals
Keri Hilson
Nicki Minaj
Paramore

Guest performers
Ann and Nancy Wilson of Heart
MC Lyte

Presenters
Brandy
Marisa Miller
Nicole "Snooki" Polizzi and Michael "The Situation" Sorrentino from Jersey Shore
Jeffrey Ross
Michael Strahan
and several servicemen and servicewomen

Show sequence
Katy Perry, Keri Hilson, and Jennifer Nettles – "Boogie Woogie Bugle Boy"
Katy Perry – "California Gurls"
Katy Perry – "Teenage Dream" – Not aired in television broadcast 
Katy Perry – "Hot N Cold" – Not aired in television broadcast
Paramore – "The Only Exception"
Paramore – "Decode" – Not aired in television broadcast 
Paramore – "Misery Business" – Not aired in television broadcast
Sugarland and MC Lyte – "Stuck Like Glue"
Sugarland – "Tonight" – Not aired in television broadcast
Sugarland – "All I Want to Do" – Not aired in television broadcast
Grace Potter and The Nocturnals – "Top Gun Anthem" / "Paris (Oh La La)"
Grace Potter and the Nocturnals – "Medicine" – Not aired in television broadcast
Grace Potter and The Nocturnals and Ann and Nancy Wilson of Heart – "Crazy On You"
Grace Potter and The Nocturnals and Ann and Nancy Wilson of Heart – "Rockin' in the Free World" – Not aired in television broadcast
Nicki Minaj – "Moment 4 Life" – Not aired in television broadcast
Nicki Minaj – "Right Thru Me"
Nicki Minaj – "Roman's Revenge" – Not aired in television broadcast
Katy Perry and Nicki Minaj – "Girls Just Want To Have Fun"
Paramore – "My Hero"
Keri Hilson – "Turnin Me On" – Not aired in television broadcast
Keri Hilson – "Knock You Down" – Not aired in television broadcast
Keri Hilson – "Pretty Girl Rock"
Sugarland and Keri Hilson – "Think"
Katy Perry – "Firework"

VH1 Divas Celebrates Soul
VH1 Divas Celebrates Soul  was the third of three concerts in the series not aired live. It was taped on December 18, 2011, at the Hammerstein Ballroom in New York City, and aired the next evening on VH1, paying tribute to the places that helped create or contributed to soul music: Chicago, Detroit, London, Philadelphia and Memphis.

Anita Baker, who was going to sing with Jill Scott, had to drop out moments before the concert after disagreements with producers, allowing Marsha Ambrosius and Ledisi to step in and perform in their places during the Detroit medley. Kelly Clarkson twisted her ankle on the way into the concert, though she still performed as planned.

The concert was never released on CD or DVD.

Headliners
Mary J. Blige
Kelly Clarkson
Jennifer Hudson
Florence Welch
Jessie J
Jill Scott

House band
The Roots

Guest performers
Marsha Ambrosius
Erykah Badu
Boyz II Men
Estelle
Wanda Jackson
Sharon Jones & The Dap-Kings
Chaka Khan
Ledisi
Travie McCoy
Martha Reeves
Mavis Staples

Presenters
La La Anthony
Common
Terrence Howard
Samuel L. Jackson
Queen Latifah
Nas
Dolly Parton
Archie Panjabi
Sherri Shepherd

Show sequence
Medley:
Kelly Clarkson, Mary J. Blige, and Jennifer Hudson – "You Keep Me Hangin' On"
Jennifer Hudson – "Spotlight"
Mary J. Blige" – "Real Love"
Kelly Clarkson – "Since U Been Gone"
Kelly Clarkson, Mary J. Blige, and Jennifer Hudson – "You Keep Me Hangin' On (Reprise)"
Memphis tribute:
Jennifer Hudson and Jessie J – "Knock on Wood"
Erykah Badu, Chaka Kahn, and Mavis Staples – "I'll Take You There"
Florence + the Machine with Golden Orb Girls – "Shake It Out"
Detroit medley:
Marsha Ambrosius, Sharon Jones and Martha Reeves – "Nowhere to Run"
Kelly Clarkson and Ledisi – "Chain of Fools"
Marsha Ambrosius and Ledisi – "Sweet Love"
Jessie J – "Domino"
Mary J. Blige – "Mr. Wrong"
Amy Winehouse Tribute:
Sharon Jones & The Dap-Kings and Wanda Jackson- "You Know I'm No Good"
Florence Welch – "Back to Black"
Philadelphia medley:
Estelle and Travie McCoy – "Wake Up Everybody"
Jill Scott, Erykah Badu, and Black Thought – "You Got Me"
Boyz II Men – "Motownphilly"
Jill Scott – "Hear My Call"
Kelly Clarkson – "What Doesn't Kill You (Stronger)"
London medley:
Estelle, Erykah Badu, Marsha Ambrosius, and ?uestlove – "Back to Life (However Do You Want Me)"
Florence Welch – "Walking On Broken Glass"
Jennifer Hudson  – "Night of Your Life"
Chicago medley:
Sharon Jones and Ledisi – "Rescue Me"
Mary J. Blige and Chaka Kahn – "Ain't Nobody"
Sharon Jones and The Dap-Kings – "He Said I Can"  – Not aired in television broadcast

VH1 Divas 2012
VH1 Divas 2012 aired live on December 16, 2012 from the Shrine Auditorium in Los Angeles. The show was hosted by Adam Lambert and celebrated the dance-inducing music that is the vibrant soundtrack to every major blowout bash, unforgettable party and night out on the town. The show also paid tribute to the late music legends who died earlier that year: Whitney Houston and Donna Summer.

Host and performer
Adam Lambert

Headliners
Kelly Clarkson
Ciara
Miley Cyrus
Demi Lovato
Natasha Bedingfield
Keri Hilson
Kelly Rowland
Jordin Sparks
Ledisi
Melanie Fiona
Metric

Guest performers
Iggy Azalea
Bootsy Collins
Paloma Faith
Pitbull

Presenters
La La Anthony
Elisha Cuthbert
Jenna Dewan
Sheila E.
Kat Graham
Stacy Keibler
Ellie Kemper
Nene Leakes
Brandy
Kelly Osbourne
LA Reid
Amber Riley

House DJ
Havana Brown

Show sequence
Adam Lambert – "Let's Dance"
Kelly Clarkson – "Catch My Breath"
Ciara –  "Billie Jean"/ "Got Me Good"
Donna Summer Tribute
Kelly Rowland – "I Feel Love"/"Bad Girls"
Keri Hilson – "She Works Hard for the Money"
Adam Lambert – "Love to Love You Baby"/"Hot Stuff"
Kelly Rowland, Keri Hilson & Adam Lambert – "Last Dance"
Metric – "Heart of Glass"
Demi Lovato – "Give Your Heart a Break"
Paloma Faith – "Picking Up the Pieces"
Miley Cyrus – "Rebel Yell"
Natasha Bedingfield, Iggy Azalea & Bootsy Collins – "Groove Is in the Heart"
Metric – "Breathing Underwater"
Adam Lambert – "Ray of Light"
Whitney Houston Tribute
Jordin Sparks –  "I'm Every Woman"
Melanie Fiona – "I Wanna Dance With Somebody (Who Loves Me)"/"It's Not Right but It's Okay"
Ledisi, Jordin Sparks & Melanie Fiona –  "How Will I Know"
Pitbull – "Don't Stop the Party"

VH1 Divas Holiday: Unsilent Night
VH1 Divas Holiday: Unsilent Night was recorded on December 2, 2016, at the Kings Theater in Brooklyn, airing December 5, 2016. The concert was a holiday-themed celebration of music and pop-culture's greatest divas. The lineup included 'the Queen of Christmas' Mariah Carey, who returned to the Divas stage after 16 years for her third appearance, and Mariah's godmother, the iconic Patti LaBelle. Teyana Taylor and Vanessa Williams made debut appearances on the VH1 Divas stage, while the legendary Chaka Khan returned for her fourth time. The concert was the highest rated VH1 Divas broadcast in over a decade.

Headliners
Mariah Carey
Chaka Khan
Patti LaBelle
Vanessa Williams
Teyana Taylor

Guest Performers
Diana Gordon
JoJo
Remy Ma
Bebe Rexha
Serayah

Presenters
La La Anthony
Ashley Graham
Jillian Hervey
Gloria Reuben
Mack Wilds
Afton Williamson

Show sequence
Mariah Carey – "All I Want For Christmas Is You"
JoJo, Serayah & Bebe Rexha – "All Alone On Christmas"
Remy Ma – "Christmas in Hollis"
Patti LaBelle – "When You've Been Blessed (Feels Like Heaven)"
Teyana Taylor – "Santa Baby"
Vanessa Williams – "Save the Best for Last"/"What Child Is This?"
Diana Gordon – "Jingle Bell Rock"
Chaka Khan – "Medley"
"Ain't Nobody"
"Natural Woman" with Patti LaBelle
"I'm Every Woman" with Patti LaBelle, Teyana Taylor, JoJo, Bebe Rexha, Serayah, Diana Gordon & Remy Ma

Legacy and impact
Saturday Night Live performers Ana Gasteyer, Molly Shannon and Cheri Oteri frequently spoofed Dion, Twain and Carey, most memorably in the opening moments of Divas '99 where they portrayed the songstresses attempting to order a pizza before watching the concert. On February 10, 2001, Jennifer Lopez starred in an SNL skit where she battled Mango onstage at VH1 Divas, with Tracy Morgan as Franklin, Maya Rudolph as Diana Ross, and Gasteyer and Shannon both reprising their impressions of Dion and Twain respectively.

Many of the featured performers are satirized as characters on the popular web parody Got 2B Real.

On season 3 of RuPaul's Drag Race All Stars, the second challenge of the season was a Divas parody. Aja portrayed Amy Winehouse, BeBe Zahara Benet was Diana Ross, BenDeLaCreme was Julie Andrews, Chi Chi DeVayne was Patti LaBelle, Kennedy Davenport played as Janet Jackson, Milk acted as Celine Dion, Shangela was Mariah Carey, Thorgy Thor impersonated Stevie Nicks and Trixie Mattel played as Dolly Parton. Shangela and BenDeLaCreme won the challenge.

Other networks attempted to replicate the success of the Divas concerts with varying degrees of success. The year after the original Divas, BET premiered Girls Nite Out, hosted by Rachel and Joe Clair. The featured performers were Arista labelmates Deborah Cox, Faith Evans, Andrea Martin, Monica, and Shanice. Lifetime hosted Women Rock! Girls & Guitars annually from 2000 to 2004, eventually shortened to simply Women Rock! and raising awareness for their campaign "Our Lifetime Commitment: Stop Breast Cancer for Life." Performers over the years included Anastacia, Blondie, Kelly Clarkson, Destiny's Child, En Vogue, Melissa Etheridge, Cyndi Lauper, and Lee Ann Womack.

References

External links
 VH1
 VH1 Divas
 VH1 Save the Music Foundation

VH1 original programming
Mariah Carey video albums
Celine Dion video albums
Whitney Houston video albums
Pop music television series
1990s American television series
2000s American television series
Various artists albums